Brandon Jordan Miller (born November 22, 2002) is an American college basketball player for the Alabama Crimson Tide of the Southeastern Conference (SEC). He was a consensus five-star recruit and one of the top players in the 2022 class.

Early life and high school career
Miller grew up in Antioch, Tennessee, and attended Cane Ridge High School. He was named the Tennessee Gatorade Player of the Year after averaging 23.3 points, eight rebounds, 4.3 assists, 2.6 blocks, and 2.3 steals per game during his junior season. Miller repeated as the Gatorade Player of the Year as a senior after averaging 24.1 points, 8.5 rebounds, 4.3 assists, and 2.3 steals per game.

Recruiting
Miller was a consensus five-star recruit and one of the top players in the 2022 class, according to major recruiting services. On November 1, 2021, he committed to playing college basketball for Alabama after considering offers from Kansas and Tennessee State. He also considered playing professionally in Australia NBL or the G League Ignite.

College career
Miller was named to the Naismith College Player of the Year and Julius Erving Award watch lists entering his freshman season at Alabama. On November 21, 2022, Miller earned his first Southeastern Conference (SEC) Freshman of the Week honor. On December 17, 2022, Miller scored 36 points and six rebounds against Gonzaga. He posted an Alabama freshman-record 41 points on February 22, 2023, in a 78–76 overtime win against South Carolina.

On March 13, 2023, Miller was named as one of five players on the first team of the Associated Press All Americans.  He is the only freshman on this year’s first team.

Firearm incident
On February 21, 2023, a Tuscaloosa police officer testified that Miller brought a firearm to teammate Darius Miles that was used in the fatal shooting of 23-year-old Jamea Jonae Harris in Tuscaloosa earlier that year. According to Miller's attorney, Miles had left the gun in Miller's vehicle after Miller dropped Miles off at a club. As Miller was on his way back to pick up Miles, Miles texted Miller, requesting that Miller bring Miles's gun. When Miller arrived, Miles told his friend Michael Davis that the gun was in the vehicle. Davis retrieved the gun and shot into a vehicle in which Harris was a passenger, while Harris's boyfriend returned fire, resulting in two bullets striking Miller's car. Miller's attorney stated that Miller had no knowledge of any intent to use the weapon. According to the Tuscaloosa police officer's testimony, while Miles and Davis initially lied to officers about the incident, Miller’s account of the  shooting almost exactly matched what investigators gathered from video evidence and other witness testimony. Tuscaloosa County chief deputy district attorney Paula Whitley stated Miller faces no charges as a result of the incident.

References

External links
Alabama Crimson Tide bio

2002 births
Living people
Alabama Crimson Tide men's basketball players
All-American college men's basketball players
American men's basketball players
Basketball players from Tennessee
McDonald's High School All-Americans
People from Antioch, Tennessee
Small forwards